Magnar Estenstad (27 September 1924 – 13 May 2004) was a Norwegian cross-country skier. In 1952 he won the 50 km event at the Holmenkollen ski festival and a silver medal in the 4 × 10 km relay and a bronze in the 50 km at the Oslo Olympics. Next year he was awarded the Holmenkollen medal. Domestically he won the 50 km Norwegian title in 1948–1949 and 1952–1954. In 1950 he won the national 30 km title and placed seventh over 50 km at the world championships. In 1954, after winning the 50 km national title he was about to win the 30 km race, but fell and broke his thigh bone one kilometer away from the finish. He was hospitalized for five months and had to retire from skiing. He worked as a farmer for the rest of his life.

Cross-country skiing results
All results are sourced from the International Ski Federation (FIS).

Olympic Games
 2 medals – (1 silver, 1 bronze)

World Championships

References

External links

 
  – click Holmenkollmedaljen for downloadable pdf file 
  – click Vinnere for downloadable pdf file 

1924 births
2004 deaths
Cross-country skiers at the 1952 Winter Olympics
Holmenkollen medalists
Holmenkollen Ski Festival winners
Norwegian male cross-country skiers
Olympic cross-country skiers of Norway
Olympic silver medalists for Norway
Olympic bronze medalists for Norway
Olympic medalists in cross-country skiing
Medalists at the 1952 Winter Olympics
People from Melhus
Sportspeople from Trøndelag